Clinton Township is a township in Douglas County, Kansas, USA.  As of the 2000 census, its population was 531. It took its name from Clinton, Illinois.

Geography
According to the USGS, it contains one cemetery, Clinton.

The stream of Elk Creek runs through this township.

Adjacent Townships
Kanwaka Township, Douglas County (north)
Wakarusa Township, Douglas County (east)
Willow Springs Township, Douglas County (southeast)
Marion Township, Douglas County (south)
Elk Township, Osage County (southwest)
Monmouth Township, Shawnee County (west)

Towns and Settlements
Although these towns may not be incorporated or populated, they are still placed on maps produced by the county.

Clinton, located at

Places of interest
The Clinton Lake Museum, outside of Clinton near Bloomington Beach, features photographs and histories of small towns that used to be in the area.  It also has an exhibit on the Underground Railroad.
Saunder's Mound, in the Clinton Lake Overlook Park, was once a popular gathering spot for the former town of Sigil and was used for picnics and fireworks.

References

 USGS Geographic Names Information System (GNIS)

External links
 US-Counties.com
 City-Data.com

Townships in Douglas County, Kansas
Townships in Kansas